Paul Bird Motorsport are a British motorcycle road racing, car racing and rallying organisation. The owner Paul Bird competed as a rally driver and was formerly a solo-rider in motocross. His son Frank is a car racer.

Motorcycle racing
The team competes in the British Superbike Championship, using Ducati machinery from 2016, based on the 1199 Panigale R, a change of manufacturer from Kawasaki. They managed the Kawasaki World Superbike team until 2011, and competed in MotoGP from the 2012 season.

PBM competed in the 2014 British Superbike Championship as a two-rider team with Shane Byrne and Stuart Easton on board Kawasakis. Also in 2014 Ian Hutchinson joined Paul Bird Motorsport for a few rounds of Pirelli National Superstock 1000 competition on the Rapid Solicitors Kawasaki team, after which he again competed in the Macau road GP on Shane Byrne's superbike, but without his previous year's success, overshooting a corner and retiring after a low-speed fall. The race was won by PBM rider Stuart Easton.

For 2015 Hutchinson competed in selected BSB rounds and Paul Bird's first foray into racing on closed public roads in UK, involving the North West 200 and the Ulster Grand Prix in Northern Ireland and also in the Isle of Man TT races, where he won three TT races and a TT Championship.

On 16 October 2015 Paul Bird Motorsport announced a sponsorship arrangement with Be Wiser Insurance and that the 2016 BSB team would be four-time BSB champion Shane Byrne and Glenn Irwin, riding Ducati Panigale Rs. This sponsorship continued until the end of 2019 season. For 2020 and 2021, the team arranged a new title sponsor by Kent-based Video Telematics business VisionTrack, followed by MCE insurance from 2022.

Personal life
In December 2015, Paul Bird received a ban from organised sport competitions until July 2017 administered by UKAD, the UK Anti-Doping agency, after failing a standard test for banned substances. He tested positive for cocaine after driving in a car rally event in July 2015. This was followed by an eight-year ban imposed in 2019 by UKAD, for refusing a drugs-test following a Welsh rally event in April 2018. The ban will run from 11 July 2018 until 2026.

Bird's son Frank drove in Ford MSA Formula for Fortec Motorsport in 2016, after the 2015 season in Ginetta Junior Championship.

For 2022, Frank Bird competed in Asian Le Mans Series, having participated in some rally car driving during the winter, and intends to enter the Sol Rally Barbados in June 2022, twice won by Paul Bird.

MotoGP

MotoGP team
PBM competed in the 2012 MotoGP season with an ART-Aprilia bike entered to CRT regulations ridden by James Ellison, and with riders Michael Laverty and Broc Parkes in the 2014 MotoGP season before disbanding to concentrate on British Superbikes.

Results
(key) (Races in bold indicate pole position; races in italics indicate fastest lap)

References

External links
  
 Profile on MotoGP.com

Motorcycle racing teams
Companies based in Cumbria
British auto racing teams